Sandra (Sandi) Kirby  is a Canadian sociologist and former Olympic athlete. A member of the Canadian women's rowing team at the 1976 Summer Olympics, she competed in the women's quad sculls, with her team finishing ninth.

After competing at the Olympics, she lobbied for a number of years to have the International Olympic Committee drop its requirement that all female athletes automatically had to undergo chromosomal testing to ensure that they were actually female, a rule which was not dropped until the 2000 Summer Olympics.

Kirby completed a bachelor's degree in physical education at the University of British Columbia in 1971 and B.Ed. degree at the same institution in 1972. She later obtained a master's degree at McGill University in 1980, and a doctorate from the University of Alberta in 1986. She is a professor Emerita of sociology at the University of Winnipeg, specializing in study of women in sports. She came out as lesbian after joining the university. She is active in the development of safe sport for athletes as a founding board member of Safe Sport International, and as a speaker on sexual harassment and abuse in sport.

In 2018, Kirby was inducted into the Canada's Sports Hall of Fame.

Bibliography
Books by Sandra Kirby include:
 The dome of silence : sexual harassment and abuse in sport (2000, 2008)
 Playing it Forward: 50 years of Women and Sport in Canada
 Experience research social change : methods from the margins (1998, 2010, 2017)
 Games analysis (1993)
 High performance female athlete retirement (1986)

References

1949 births
Living people
Canadian sociologists
Olympic rowers of Canada
Canadian female rowers
Canadian LGBT sportspeople
Canadian LGBT scientists
Lesbian sportswomen
Canadian lesbian writers
University of British Columbia alumni
McGill University alumni
University of Alberta alumni
Academic staff of University of Winnipeg
Rowers at the 1976 Summer Olympics
Sportspeople from Calgary
Writers from Calgary
LGBT rowers
Lesbian academics
Officers of the Order of Canada
Canadian women sociologists
Canadian LGBT academics